Lužnica Castle is a baroque building in Zaprešić, Croatia.

History 

It is believed that the Castle was built at the beginning of the 18th century. Since 1791 the estate was the owned by von Rauch noble family. They soon had the Castle renovated and further expanded. At the end of 19th century, Marija Jurić Zagorka, lived in the Castle from the age of 3 until 10 years, as her father was estate manager for the von Rauch family. She later became one of the most prominent Croatian writers of a time. Countess Antonija noticed the talent of young Zagorka, so she made possible for her to use the castle library and attend private schooling lessons along her own kids. In 1923, Geza, the final member of Rauch family was killed under suspicious circumstances. Following his death, his widow Antonija, sold Lužnica, which then became property of Daughters of Charity of Saint Vincent de Paul. 

At a time, this order was looking for a large estate close to capital, Zagreb, for sixty of its members. One part of the manor was soon turned into a hospital, another part into a chapel, while surrounding land was used for agriculture. The goods from the estate were shipped to a Sisters of Charity Hospital in Zagreb. At the beginning of the 20th century, the manor was also used as a kindergarten, music and householding school for the local community.

References 

Zaprešić
Buildings and structures in Zagreb County
Tourist attractions in Zagreb County